Marquess of Ailesbury (later styled Aylesbury), in the County of Buckingham, is a title in the Peerage of the United Kingdom. It was created on 17 July 1821 for Charles Brudenell-Bruce, 2nd Earl of Ailesbury.

On 18 March 1664, Robert Bruce, 2nd Earl of Elgin in the Peerage of Scotland was created Baron Bruce, of Skelton in the County of York, Viscount Bruce, of Ampthill in the County of Bedford, and Earl of Ailesbury, in the County of Buckingham, all in the Peerage of England. His grandson, Charles, the 3rd Earl of Ailesbury (and 4th Earl of Elgin), was created Baron Bruce, of Tottenham in the County of Wilts, on 17 April 1746, in the Peerage of Great Britain, with a special remainder to his nephew, the Honourable Thomas Brudenell, fourth and youngest son of George Brudenell, 3rd Earl of Cardigan, by Lady Elizabeth Bruce, sister of the 3rd Earl of Ailesbury. On Lord Ailesbury's death in 1747, his English titles became extinct, except for the 1746 Barony of Bruce, which was inherited by his nephew, Robert, according to the special remainder. His Scottish titles passed to his kinsman, Charles Bruce, 5th Earl of Elgin.

Thomas Brudenell, 2nd Baron Bruce, assumed the additional surname of Bruce by Royal licence in 1767. On 10 June 1776 he was created Earl of Ailesbury, in the County of Buckingham, in the Peerage of Great Britain, a revival of the title which had become extinct on his uncle's death 29 years earlier. His son, Charles Brudenell-Bruce, 2nd Earl of Ailesbury was created Viscount Savernake, of Savernake Forest in the County of Wilts, Earl Bruce, of Whorlton in the County of York, and Marquess of Ailesbury, in the County of Buckingham, on 17 July 1821, all in the Peerage of the United Kingdom. In 1838 his eldest son, George Brudenell-Bruce, 2nd Marquess of Ailesbury, was summoned to the House of Lords through a writ of acceleration in his father's junior title of Baron Bruce. In 1868 the 2nd Marquess also inherited the Earldom of Cardigan from his kinsman the 7th Earl of Cardigan, and so the Marquesses of Ailesbury now also hold the titles Earl of Cardigan (1661) and Baron Brudenell, of Stonton in the County of Leicester (1628), in the Peerage of England, as well as being Baronets of England, styled "of Deene in the County of Northampton".

The 2nd Marquess was succeeded by his younger brother, Ernest Brudenell-Bruce, 3rd Marquess of Ailesbury, who had previously sat in the House of Commons for 46 years under the name of Lord Ernest Bruce. The 3rd Marquess was succeeded by his grandson, George Brudenell-Bruce, 4th Marquess of Ailesbury, the only son of George John Brudenell-Bruce. The 4th Marquess died bankrupt at an early age and was succeeded by his uncle, Henry Brudenell-Bruce, 5th Marquess of Ailesbury, who had previously represented Chippenham in Parliament under the name of Lord Henry Bruce. As of 2013 the titles are held by the 5th Marquess's great-grandson, Michael Brudenell-Bruce, 8th Marquess of Ailesbury, the titles having descended from father to son.

The heir apparent to the Marquessate bears the courtesy title Earl of Cardigan, and his heir apparent bears the title Viscount Savernake. Between 1776 and 1821 the heir apparent to the earldom of Ailesbury bore the courtesy title Lord Bruce. Between 1821 and 1868 the heir apparent to the marquessate bore the courtesy title Earl Bruce while Earl Bruce's heir apparent bore the title Viscount Savernake.

Ever since Thomas Bruce, 2nd Earl of Ailesbury succeeded his father in 1685, every Earl and Marquess of Ailesbury has also been a Hereditary Warden of Savernake Forest. This explains the usage of the title Viscount Savernake within the family. Although not an earl until 1685, Thomas Bruce had already inherited the Wardenship through his marriage to Lady Elizabeth Seymour in 1676, as the Wardenship had previously been in the Seymour family. The current Lord Ailesbury was the 30th such Warden, until he retired in 1987, at which time his son David Brudenell-Bruce, Earl of Cardigan became the 31st Warden.

Lord Charles Bruce, youngest son of the 1st Marquess, was a Liberal politician. A descendant of the 3rd Marquess is the model Florence Brudenell-Bruce.

The family seat was Tottenham House, near Marlborough, Wiltshire. The family last lived in the house in 1945, after which it became a school, and was sold in 2015. The Estate is held in a trust,  controlled by the family. In 2013, the heir to the marquessate, Earl of Cardigan, filed a lawsuit against the trustees, alleging mismanagement. As a result, the two Trustees were ordered to stand down.

Coat of arms

The heraldic blazon for the coat of arms of the marquessate is: Quarterly: 1st and 4th, or a saltire and chief gules on a canton argent a lion rampant azure (for Bruce); 2nd and 3rd, argent a chevron gules between three chapeaux to the sinister azure (for Brudenell). This can be translated as: a shield divided into quarters, the top left and bottom right quarters being gold, with a red saltire over the gold field, and the top part of the shield also being red.  In addition, there is a white square in the top left corner of the shield with a blue lion rampant (for the Bruce family); the top right and bottom left quarters are white with a red chevron between three blue caps of state that are turned to face to the viewer's right (for the Brudenell family).

Earls of Ailesbury, Viscount Bruce, Baron Bruce: First creation (1664) 
Robert Bruce, 2nd Earl of Elgin, 1st Earl of Ailesbury (c. 1626–1685)
Thomas Bruce, 3rd Earl of Elgin, 2nd Earl of Ailesbury (1656–1741)
Charles Bruce, 4th Earl of Elgin, 3rd Earl of Ailesbury (1682–1747) (Created Baron Bruce in 1746 in the peerage of Great Britain with remainder to his nephew)

Barons Bruce (1746)
Charles Bruce, 4th Earl of Elgin, 3rd Earl of Ailesbury, 1st Baron Bruce (1682–1747)
Thomas Brudenell-Bruce, 2nd Baron Bruce (1729–1814) (Younger nephew, created Earl of Ailesbury in 1776)

Earls of Ailesbury; Second creation (1776)
Thomas Brudenell-Bruce, 1st Earl of Ailesbury (1729–1814)
George Bruce-Brudenell, Lord Bruce (1762–1783)
Charles Brudenell-Bruce, 2nd Earl of Ailesbury (1773–1856) (created Viscount Savernake, Earl Bruce, and  Marquess of Ailesbury in 1821)

Marquesses of Ailesbury (1821), Earls of Cardigan (inherited 1868)
Charles Brudenell-Bruce, 1st Marquess of Ailesbury (1773–1856)
George Brudenell-Bruce, 2nd Marquess of Ailesbury (1804–1878)
Ernest Brudenell-Bruce, 3rd Marquess of Ailesbury (1811–1886)
George John Brudenell-Bruce (1839–1868)
George Brudenell-Bruce, 4th Marquess of Ailesbury (1863–1894)
Henry Brudenell-Bruce, 5th Marquess of Ailesbury (1842–1911)
George Brudenell-Bruce, 6th Marquess of Ailesbury  (1873–1961)
Cedric Brudenell-Bruce, 7th Marquess of Ailesbury (1904–1974)
Michael Brudenell-Bruce, 8th Marquess of Ailesbury (b. 1926)

The heir apparent is the present holder's son David Brudenell-Bruce, Earl of Cardigan (b. 1952).
The heir apparent's heir apparent is his son Thomas Brudenell-Bruce, Viscount Savernake (b. 1982).

 Ernest Brudenell-Bruce, 3rd Marquess of Ailesbury, 9th Earl of Cardigan (1811–1886)
 Henry Brudenell-Bruce, 5th Marquess of Ailesbury, 11th Earl of Cardigan (1842–1911)
 George Brudenell-Bruce, 6th Marquess of Ailesbury, 12th Earl of Cardigan (1873–1961)
 Chandos Brudenell-Bruce, 7th Marquess of Ailesbury, 13th Earl of Cardigan (1904–1974)
 Michael Brudenell-Bruce, 8th Marquess of Ailesbury, 14th Earl of Cardigan (b. 1926)
(1). David Brudenell-Bruce, Earl of Cardigan (b. 1952)
(2). Thomas Brudenell-Bruce, Viscount Savernake (b. 1982)
(3). Lord Charles Adam Brudenell-Bruce (b. 1951)
Lord Robert Thomas Brudenell-Bruce (1845–1912)
George Lionel Thomas Brudenell (1880–1962)
Edmund Crispin Stephen James George Brudenell (1928–2014)
male issue in succession
Robert Hanbury Brudenell-Bruce (1881–1955)
Chandos Robert Henry Brudenell-Bruce (1923–1993)
male issue in succession
John Charles Brudenell-Bruce (1885–1960)
Simon Robert Brudenell-Bruce (1928–2008)
male issue in succession
Marc Hadrian Brudenell-Bruce (1930–1965)
male issue in succession

Family tree

Notes

References

External links
Ailesbury Mausoleum

Marquessates in the Peerage of the United Kingdom
Ailesbury
Noble titles created in 1821
Noble titles created for UK MPs